Syningthwaite Priory was a priory in West Yorkshire, England. Syningthwaite is the site of the Cistercian convent of St Mary, founded  by Bertram Haget and suppressed in 1535, having been heavily in debt in the early 16th century. At the Dissolution the priory housed nine nuns, the prioress, eight servants and other labourers. The priory site is enclosed by a moat and includes a Chapel Garth.

References

Monasteries in West Yorkshire
1160s establishments in England
1535 disestablishments in England
Christian monasteries established in the 12th century
Cistercian nunneries in England